is a Japanese long jumper. She holds a personal best jump of 6.59 metres. She was a bronze medalist at the 2011 Asian Championships and a three-time national champion at the Japanese Championships.

Her mother Emiko Koumaru is also a former Long jumper, having competed at the 1964 Summer Olympics in Tokyo. She was also the 1966 Japanese Championships champion and former Japanese record holder.

Personal bests

International competition

National titles
National Championships
Long jump: 2012, 2013, 2015
National Sports Festival
100 m: 1999 (U19)
Long jump: 1999 (U19), 2010, 2011, 2015
National Corporate Championships
Long jump: 2007
National High School Championships
Long jump: 2000

References

External links

Saeko Okayama at JAAF 

1982 births
Living people
Sportspeople from Hiroshima Prefecture
Japanese female long jumpers
Japan Championships in Athletics winners
Waseda University alumni
21st-century Japanese women